Lovewar was an American technical hard rock band. They released just one album titled Soak Your Brain, which was published in 1993 before disbanding a few years later. It was produced by the siblings John Elefante and Dino Elefante. In 2019, they released a self-titled album featuring all 3 members.

Soak Your Brain ranked 47/100 in the Heaven's Metal Top 100 Christian Rock Albums of All Time.

Bassist Rick Armstrong used to play for the Christian metal band Whitecross. He played bass on their 1993 output Triumphant Return.

Guitarist Tim Bushong produced "Tsar Bomba" for Christian hardrockers Bride several years later. He also acted as engineer and recordist for many other Christian and secular albums. He currently pastors Syracuse (IN) Baptist Church.

Drummer Greg Purlee now plays in the Christian country quartet, Simon Peter Band.

Members 
 Tim Bushong (lead vocals, guitar)
 Greg Purlee (drums, backing vocals)
 Rick Armstrong (bass, backing vocals)

Discography 
 Demo (1990)
 Soak Your Brain (1993) Pakaderm Records, Word Records
 Lovewar (2019) Roxx Records

References 

Musical groups established in 1990
American Christian metal musical groups